The Subsidy Reinvestment and Empowerment Program known as 'SURE-P is a scheme established by the Federal Government of Nigeria during the Jonathan Administration, to re-investing the Federal Government savings from fuel subsidy removal on critical infrastructure projects and social safety net programmes with direct impact on the citizens of Nigeria.

SURE-P was established in January 2012 when the Federal Government of Nigeria announced the removal of subsidy on Petroleum Motor Spirit (PMS).

The scheme is one of the pivots of Transformation Agenda of the Federal Government. The pioneer Chairman of the program is Dr. Christopher Kolade. He resigned his appointment in September 2013. He was succeeded by General Martin Luther Agwai who himself was succeeded by Mr Ishaya Dare Akau.

Objectives
The core objectives of the program includes but not limited to:

Provision of employments for unemployed graduates through internship programs  
Creating database of unemployed youth and reduce social vulnerability among the group in the country through the mechanism of the policy.

External links
Official Website
Federal Ministry of Finance

References

2012 establishments in Nigeria
Government agencies of Nigeria
Presidency of Goodluck Jonathan